Statistics of the Scottish Football League in season 2011–12.

After the season ended, Rangers were liquidated, and re-formed in the Third Division.  This meant that three further promotion places were created: these went to Dundee, Airdrie United and Stranraer.  Airdrie United and Stranraer earned promotion as the losers in the playoff finals.

Scottish First Division

Scottish Second Division

Scottish Third Division

See also
2011–12 in Scottish football

References

 
Scottish Football League seasons